Kai Greene (born July 7, 1993) is an American soccer player who currently plays for Monterey Bay in the USL Championship.

Career

Youth and College
Raised in South Orange, New Jersey, Greene played soccer at Columbia High School.

Greene played four years of college soccer at the Seton Hall University between 2011 and 2014, originally as a midfielder before transitioning to a defender.

Professional
In 2015, Greene trained in Germany with Borussia Neunkirchen and SV Elversberg, before signing with United Soccer League side Rio Grande Valley FC on March 16, 2016.

On December 6, 2018, Greene joined San Antonio FC ahead of the 2019 USL Championship season.

On May 31, 2021, Green signed with USL Championship side Oakland Roots.

On February 14, 2022, Greene was transferred to USL Championship side Monterey Bay ahead of their inaugural season. Greene was included in the starting 11 for Monterey Bay's inaugural match, a 4-2 loss to Phoenix Rising FC. At the conclusion of the 2022 season Greene was named Defensive Player of the Year, an award voted on by his teammates. Prior to the 2023 season Greene signed a new two-year contract with Monterey Bay.

References

External links
Seton Hall Pirates bio

1993 births
Living people
American soccer players
Association football defenders
Columbia High School (New Jersey) alumni
People from South Orange, New Jersey
Monterey Bay FC players
Oakland Roots SC players
Rio Grande Valley FC Toros players
San Antonio FC players
Seton Hall Pirates men's soccer players
Soccer players from New Jersey
Sportspeople from Essex County, New Jersey
Sportspeople from Jersey City, New Jersey
USL Championship players